Chuck Garland and R. Norris Williams defeated Algernon Kingscote and James Cecil Parke in the final, 4–6, 6–4, 7–5, 6–2 to win the gentlemen's doubles tennis title at the 1920 Wimbledon Championships. The reigning champions Pat O'Hara Wood and Ronald Thomas did not defend their title.

Draw

Finals

Top half

Section 1

Section 2

The nationalities of CF Sanderson and PJ Baird are unknown.

Bottom half

Section 3

Section 4

References

External links

Men's Doubles
Wimbledon Championship by year – Men's doubles